Kelley Square is a square located in Worcester, Massachusetts, at the intersection of Massachusetts Route 122 and 122A, with ramp access to and from Interstate 290. It is named for Sgt. Cornelius F. Kelley, who died of wounds received in battle in Verdun, France, on October 13, 1918.

Roads
The seven roads that intersect Kelley Square are listed below, starting with Madison Street on the west side of the square and proceeding around the square in a clockwise manner.

 Route confluence

 Per traffic flow changes implemented in May 2020

Redevelopment

In October 2019, officials held a groundbreaking for the Kelley Square Improvement Project, a $240 million redevelopment project that includes construction of Polar Park, a new minor league baseball stadium, along with hotels and apartments, as well as reconstructing the square as a modified roundabout.

As part of the project, the Massachusetts Department of Transportation (MassDOT) permanently reversed the direction of traffic flow on Millbury Street, and Harding Street south of the square, effective May 6, 2020.

References

Further reading

External links
 Worcester Kelley Square Improvement Project at Mass.gov
 Kelley Square is one of Worcester's most dangerous intersections via YouTube
 Kelley Square Reimagined via YouTube

Neighborhoods in Worcester, Massachusetts
Road interchanges in Massachusetts
Squares in Massachusetts
Transportation in Worcester, Massachusetts